The 2019 Jiangxi International Women's Tennis Open was a professional tennis tournament played on hard courts. It was the 6th edition of the event, and part of the International category of the 2019 WTA Tour. It took place in Nanchang, China, from September 9 – 15, 2019.

Points and prize money

Point distribution

Prize money

Singles main draw entrants

Seeds

 Rankings are as of August 26, 2019

Other entrants
The following players received wildcards into the singles main draw:
  Gao Xinyu
  Liu Fangzhou
  Xun Fangying

The following players received entry from the qualifying draw:
  Gréta Arn 
  Jaqueline Cristian 
  Anna Danilina
  Jana Fett
  Giuliana Olmos
  Peangtarn Plipuech

Withdrawals
Before the tournament
  Tímea Babos → replaced by  Dalila Jakupović
  Mona Barthel → replaced by  Samantha Stosur
  Irina-Camelia Begu → replaced by  Sara Errani
  Eugenie Bouchard → replaced by  Nina Stojanović
  Marie Bouzková → replaced by  Wang Xinyu
  Ivana Jorović → replaced by  Lara Arruabarrena
  Svetlana Kuznetsova → replaced by  Peng Shuai
  Viktória Kužmová → replaced by  Ankita Raina

Retirements
  Monica Niculescu (left knee injury)
  Zhang Shuai (dizziness)

Doubles main draw entrants

Seeds

 Rankings are as of August 26, 2019

Other entrants
The following pairs received wildcards into the doubles main draw:
  Jiang Xinyu /  Tang Qianhui
  Sun Xuliu /  Zheng Wushuang

The following pair received entry as alternates:
  Peangtarn Plipuech /  Xun Fangying

Withdrawals
Before the tournament
  Monica Niculescu (left knee injury)

Champions

Singles

  Rebecca Peterson def.  Elena Rybakina, 6–2, 6–0

Doubles

  Wang Xinyu /  Zhu Lin def.  Peng Shuai /  Zhang Shuai, 6–2, 7–6(7–5)

References
Official website
Jiangxi International History & Prize breakdown

2019
2019 WTA Tour 
2019 in Chinese tennis
September 2019 sports events in China